Benjamin Gilani is an Indian film, television and stage actor who works in Hindi cinema.

Early life and career 
Gilani was schooled at Bishop Cotton School, Shimla. He is a postgraduate from Delhi University having studied and taught English literature at St. Stephen's College, Delhi and studied at Film and Television Institute of India (FTII) Pune class of 1972, where Naseeruddin Shah and Tom Alter were his classmates.

He founded 'Motleys Productions', a Mumbai-based theatre company in 1977, along with Tom Alter and Naseeruddin Shah, and Waiting For Godot was their first play on 29 July 1979 at Prithvi Theatre, the play was revived in 2009 for group's 30th anniversary celebrations.

Partial filmography

2022 Hush Hush

TV Series

References

External links
 

20th-century Indian male actors
Living people
Delhi University alumni
Film and Television Institute of India alumni
Indian male stage actors
Male actors in Hindi cinema
Indian male television actors
1946 births
Place of birth missing (living people)
21st-century Indian male actors
Male actors in Gujarati-language films

Bishop Cotton School Shimla alumni